Yousuf Salwan Zetuna (born 10 March 1999) is an Iraqi professional footballer of Assyrian ethnicity. His younger brother, Yohan Zetuna, is also a footballer.

Career statistics

Club

Notes

References

1999 births
Living people
Assyrian footballers
Iraqi footballers
Iraqi expatriate footballers
Association football forwards
Liga de Expansión MX players
Alebrijes de Oaxaca players
KS Kastrioti players
Expatriate footballers in Mexico
Expatriate footballers in Albania
Iraqi refugees